Paul J. Cuba (June 12, 1908 – August 12, 1990) was an American football tackle who played three seasons with the Philadelphia Eagles of the National Football League. He played college football at the University of Pittsburgh and attended New Castle High School in New Castle, Pennsylvania.

References

External links
Just Sports Stats

1908 births
1990 deaths
Players of American football from Pennsylvania
American football tackles
Pittsburgh Panthers football players
Philadelphia Eagles players
People from New Castle, Pennsylvania